If it is your life is a collection of short stories by the Scottish writer James Kelman published in 2010.

Critical reception

Writing in the Glasgow Herald, Rosemary Goring notes that "It is a tour de force from a writer who treats language as carefully as if it were gold, and ends up turning it into something even more precious".

References

Short story collections by James Kelman
2010 short story collections
Hamish Hamilton books